Manali Dey (sometimes Manali De and Manali Manisha Dey) is an Indian  television actress. She made her acting debut in the Bengali film Kali Aamar Maa in 1999. Later she made her television debut in the television serial Neer Bhanga Jhor and is very popular for her role as Mouri in Star Jalsha's Bou Kotha Kao.

Biography
Manali spent her childhood in Picnic Garden, Kolkata. However, later she moved from there. She is the only child of her parents Nitai Dey and Manisha Dey. She completed her Secondary exams from Oxford House, Ballygunge, Kolkata. In the meantime, she had already started her acting career and became extremely busy. This made her unable to continue her study in the regular mode and so, she was admitted to Amrit Academy, Kankurgachi, which is a private open-board school. From here, she completed her higher secondary examination. She got her dancing lessons from her mother and Madhumita Roy. At this time, she was having a very tough schedule managing her education as well as career. Later, on 29 November 2012, Manali married singer Saptak Bhattacharjee. The couple have divorced.

Career
Manali made her acting debut in the Bengali film Kali Aamar Maa in 1999 where she played the role of a child. After this, she became very interested in acting and made it her aim of life. She made her first breakthrough as a model for the Bengali magazine Unish-Kuri, while carrying on her school life. After making some few photos for the magazine, Manali got a call from Ravi Ojha's production house for working in Bengali television. Later on, she was cast in the Bengali television serial Neer Bhanga Jhor, which was aired on Star Jalsha. Since then, she had been cast in a number of Bengali films and television serials.

Political career
In February 2021, just before the 2021 West Bengal Legislative Assembly election, she joined All India Trinamool Congress in presence of Chief Minister of West Bengal, Mamata Banerjee.

Filmography
Manali has acted in several Bengali films since 1999.

Television
Manali has also acted in a number of Bengali television serials. She has given a dance performance in Mahisasuramardini,Colors Bangla Mahalaya 2015 played the role of Devi Shakambari in 12 Mashe 12 Rupe Debibaran, Zee Bangla Mahalaya 2019

See also
 Ritabhari Chakraborty
 Mimi Chakraborty
 Sampurna Lahiri
 Parno Mittra
 Ridhima Ghosh
Surjit Saha
Tina Dutta

References

Actresses in Bengali cinema
Actresses in Bengali television
Living people
Bengali actresses
Indian film actresses
Year of birth missing (living people)
Indian television actresses
Bengali television actresses
Actresses from Kolkata
21st-century Indian actresses